Galleria d‘Arte Moderna e Contemporanea (GAMC) is a museum of art in Viareggio, Italy. The museum is also known as "Lorenzo Viani", after the Viareggio artist whose most important public collection the museum houses. GAMC holds 3000 works by 750 artists, including 85 pieces by Viani.

References

External links 

Modern art museums in Italy
Viareggio
Art museums and galleries in Tuscany
Buildings and structures in the Province of Lucca